Deadmond Glacier is a glacier about  long, flowing from the east side of Evans Peninsula on Thurston Island into Cadwalader Inlet.

See also
 List of glaciers in the Antarctic
 Glaciology

Maps
 Thurston Island – Jones Mountains. 1:500000 Antarctica Sketch Map. US Geological Survey, 1967.
 Antarctic Digital Database (ADD). Scale 1:250000 topographic map of Antarctica. Scientific Committee on Antarctic Research (SCAR). Since 1993, regularly upgraded and updated.

References 

 

Glaciers of Thurston Island